The 22nd Annual Black Reel Awards ceremony, presented by the Foundation for the Augmentation of African-Americans in Film (FAAAF) and honoring the best films of 2021, took place on February 28, 2022, and streamed on blackreelawards.com at 5:00 p.m. PST / 8:00 p.m. EST. During the ceremony, FAAAF presented the Black Reel Awards in 24 categories. The film nominations were announced on December 16, 2021.

The Harder They Fall led the nominations with twenty and broke the record of most film nominations; this record was previously held by Black Panther (2018), which received seventeen nominations and a record-breaking ten wins in 2019. The film went on to win a total of six awards, the most wins by any film; King Richard and Passing tied for second place with three wins each, with the former winning Outstanding Motion Picture. The Harder They Fall is also the first western nominated for Outstanding Motion Picture and Outstanding Screenplay from the group. Director Jeymes Samuel tied with Radha Blank for the most individual nominations in a single year with seven; Samuel went on to win for Outstanding Director, Outstanding Emerging Director, and Outstanding Score for The Harder They Fall. At 90 years old, Rita Moreno became the oldest nominee in any category after receiving a nomination for Outstanding Supporting Actress for West Side Story.

The 6th Annual Black Reel Awards for Television nominations were announced on June 16, 2022. The ceremony took place on August 14, 2022. The sitcom Abbott Elementary led all programs with seven wins, including Outstanding Comedy Series, while HBO led all networks and platforms with ten wins from their record forty nominations. Actor Donald Glover led the pack in individual nominations with five, winning one for Outstanding Actor, Comedy Series.

Film winners and nominees

Honorary awards
 Ruby Dee Humanitarian Award – Chaz Ebert
 Vanguard Award – Halle Berry and Nate Moore
 Sidney Poitier Trailblazer Award – Laurence Fishburne
 Oscar Micheaux Memorial Award – Suzanne de Passe

Films with multiple nominations and awards

The following films received multiple nominations:

The following films received multiple awards:

Television winners and nominees

Comedy

Drama

Television Movies/Limited Series

Other categories

Television programs with multiple nominations and awards
The following programs received multiple nominations:

References

External links
 Official website

Black Reel Awards
2021 film awards
2021 in American cinema
2021 awards in the United States